Nina's Choice is an album by singer/pianist/songwriter Nina Simone. It is a compilation of singles from previous albums at Colpix Records.

Track listing
 "Trouble In Mind", live recording from Nina Simone at Newport (1960)
 "Memphis In June", from Forbidden Fruit (1960)
 "Cotton Eyed Joe", from Nina Simone at Town Hall (1959)
 "Work Song", from Forbidden Fruit
 "Forbidden Fruit", from Forbidden Fruit
 "Little Liza Jane", live recording from Nina Simone at Newport (1960)
 "Rags And Old Iron", from Forbidden Fruit
 "You Can Have Him", live recording from Nina Simone at Town Hall (1959)
 "Just Say I Love Him", from Forbidden Fruit

References

1963 compilation albums
Nina Simone compilation albums
Colpix Records compilation albums